Caitlin Greer (born 20th century) is an American actress and voice-over artist. Her voice was used in Rockstar Games' Bully as Beatrice Trudeau. She is the narrator of The New York Times-bestselling Hush, Hush novel by Becca Fitzpatrick. She has narrated many other books, but Hush, Hush, is her most known work.

Television
She has appeared in American Dreams, Saturday Night Live, Trackers, and on MTV.

Video games
Greer voiced and provided the motion capture performance for the character Beatrice Trudeau in Rockstar Games' Bully (2006).

She voiced characters for other video games including Sword of the New World: Granado Espada (2007) and Grand Theft Auto IV (2008).

Greer is an IGN award-winner and two-time nominee for Best Voice Acting: Game Ensemble (2008).

List of her narrated books

Becca Fitzpatrick's Fallen Angels Series: Hush, Hush, Crescendo, Silence, and Finale
Gabrielle Zevin's Memoirs of a Teenage Amnesiac
Judy Blundell's What I Saw, and How I Lied
Nina Malkin's Swoon
E. Lockhart's Fly on the Wall: How One Girl Saw Everything
Dana Reinhardt's How to Build a House
Rachel Cohn's The Steps
Philippa Ballantine's The Shifted World Series: Hunter and Fox and Kindred and Wings
Karen Lynch's Relentless Series: "Relentless," "Rogue," "Refuge," and "Haven"
James Patterson and Duane Swierczynski's "The Shut In"

References

External links 
 
 
 American Library Association 2011 Amazing Audiobooks for Young Adults

Place of birth missing (living people)
Year of birth missing (living people)
20th-century births
20th-century American actresses
21st-century American actresses
American television actresses
American video game actresses
American voice actresses
Audiobook narrators
Living people